Rassvet is a rural locality (a settlement) in Poperechenskoye Rural Settlement, Kotelnikovsky District, Volgograd Oblast, Russia. The population was 203 as of 2010. There are 2 streets.

Geography 
Rassvet is located in steppe, 29 km southeast of Kotelnikovo (the district's administrative centre) by road. Poperechny is the nearest rural locality.

References 

Rural localities in Kotelnikovsky District